Sušac (meaning dry island) is a small rocky island in the Adriatic Sea with an area of 4.03 km2, and 16.4 km of coastline southwest of Korčula and Lastovo, on the halfway to the island of Vis, in Croatia. The coast consists of slopes and cliffs over 100 m tall, but the opposite side features a natural harbour. A 19th-century lighthouse is built on top of the island. The island is also known for its little lake, which is connected to the sea through a siphon 15 m deep.

References

External links

Svjetionik Sušac

Uninhabited islands of Croatia
Islands of the Adriatic Sea
Landforms of Split-Dalmatia County